The Sex Offenders Act 1997 (c.51) was an Act of the Parliament of the United Kingdom, which made various sex offenders (defined as anyone who has been convicted of sexual offences) subject to notification requirements, thereby implementing a sex offenders registry. It also gave courts in the UK extraterritorial jurisdiction over a range of sexual offences.

Part I

Section 2

The Sex Offenders (Notice Requirements) (Foreign Travel) (Scotland) Regulations 2001 (S.I. 2001/188) were made under this section.

Section 5

The Sex Offenders (Certificate of Caution) Order 1997 (S.I. 1997/1921)] was made under section 5(4).

Part II - Sexual offences committed outside of the UK

Section 8

This section amended the Criminal Law (Consolidation) (Scotland) Act 1995 by inserting section 16B, which contains provision for extraterritorial jurisdiction. Section 142(5) of the Sexual Offences Act 2003 provides that section 16B continues to have effect despite the repeal of this section by that Act.

Part III - Supplementary

Section 9 - Channel Islands and Isle of Man

This section provided that Part I of the Act could be extended to the Channel Islands and to the Isle of Man by Order in Council, with such exceptions and modifications as were specified in the Order. However, no Orders were made under this section.

Section 10 - short title, commencement, and extent

The Sex Offenders Act 1997 (Commencement) Order 1997 (S.I. 1997/1920)(c.78) was made under subsection (2) of this section.

The Sex Offenders Act 1997 (Northern Ireland) Order 2001 (S.I. 2001/853) was made under subsection (3A) of this section.

Replacement
The provisions of this Act were replaced by Part II of the Sexual Offences Act 2003.

References

Sex offender registration
United Kingdom Acts of Parliament 1997